The Gila Pueblo Archaeological Foundation was a research organization which conducted archaeological research in the American Southwest and surrounding areas. It was founded in 1928 in Globe, Arizona, by Harold S. Gladwin and Winifred (McCurdy) Gladwin. It ceased operations in 1950.

Beginning
Harold S. Gladwin was a New York City stockbroker who left his position there and moved to Santa Barbara, California. There he met his future wife Winifred and William North Duane who introduced Gladwin to his cousin, archaeologist A.V. Kidder. Gladwin spent two field seasons with Kidder in northern Arizona. It was at that time when Gladwin's passion and curiosity for the Southwest grew and inspired him to start Gila Pueblo.

Research
With the backing and funding of Gladwin Gila Pueblo was able to do excavations and research throughout the Southwest. One of the most important contributions made by people working for Gila Pueblo was defining the Hohokam culture.  One of the people involved in this definition was the young Emil Haury. In 1930 Haury became the assistant director of Gila Pueblo. Another accomplishment made by Gila Pueblo was the defining of the Cochise culture.

In 1950, Gila Pueblo shut down and donated its collection to the Arizona State Museum, located on the University of Arizona campus. According to historian David Leighton, the unveiling of this archaeological collection was done in 1951, during the inauguration of University of Arizona President Richard A. Harvill. The records are held by the Arizona State Museum Library & Archives with the finding aid located on Arizona Archives Online. The building in which the foundation was located, now part of Eastern Arizona College, is on the National Register of Historic Places.

References

External links
 The Medallion papers published by Gila Pueblo, all 39 available online.
 Wingate Polychrome Bowl, the exterior of which was used as the Gila Pueblo logo.

Foundations based in the United States
History of Arizona
Globe, Arizona